Simon Imeretinsky may refer to:

Simon Imeretinsky (born 1771), Georgian royal prince
Simon Imeretinsky (born 1812), Georgian royal prince